A discography for the band The Brooklyn Bridge.

Studio albums
1968 Brooklyn Bridge
1969 The Second Brooklyn Bridge
1970 The Brooklyn Bridge
1972 The Bridge in Blue (as The Bridge)
Johnny Maestro & The Brooklyn Bridge
1989 Christmas Is... (EP)
1993 Johnny Maestro and The Brooklyn Bridge
1994 Acappella
2002 Peace on Earth
2004 Today
2007 Songs of Inspiration (reissue of Peace on Earth)
2009 Today, Volume 2

Live albums
 2008 Johnny Maestro & The Brooklyn Bridge~Greatest Hits Live

Compilations
1971 The Johnny Maestro Story
1981 Johnny Maestro sings his biggest hits with the Crests and the Brooklyn Bridge
1981 Johnny Maestro~History Of A Legend
1992 The Greatest Hits of Johnny Maestro & The Brooklyn Bridge
1992 Johnny Maestro & The Brooklyn Bridge~For Collectors Only
2006 The Best Of Johnny Maestro (1958-1985)
2010 The Solo Sides and More... Johnny Maestro ~ Maestro Music Please

Videos
2005: "Pop Legends Live"
2012: "An Intimate Evening With Johnny Maestro & The Brooklyn Bridge ~ 40th Anniversary Edition"

Other album & film appearances 
1970: "It's Your Thing" (concert)(VHS) Performers
1972: "The Daredevil" (movie)(VHS) Performers (as themselves)
1975: "20 Years of Rock & Roll" (concert)(DVD) Performers
1979: "Hair" (DVD) Johnny Maestro, Jim Rosica, Fred Ferrara—singers in "The Black Boys" musical scene
1988: "Shake, Rattle & Roll" (concert)(DVD) Performers
1990: "The Greatest Rock n' Roll Hits of the 50s and 60s" (concert)(DVD) Performers
1999: "Doo Wop 50" PBS(TV)(DVD) Performers
2005: "Doo Wop Vocal Group Greats Live" PBS(TV)(DVD) Performers (Johnny Maestro served as co-host)
2010: "Johnny Maestro Video Collection" (DVD) Performances by Johnny Maestro and The Brooklyn Bridge on TV shows and telethons

Singles

 "Worst That Could Happen" (1968/69) US #3, Canada #3 
 "Blessed Is the Rain" (1969) US #46, Canada #48
 "Welcome Me Love" (1969) US #48, Canada #38
 "Your Husband, My Wife" (1969) US #46 
 "You'll Never Walk Alone" (1969) US #51 
 "Down By the River" (1970) US #91 
 "Day Is Done" (1970) US #96
 "Christmas Serenade" (1989)

References

Discographies of American artists
Rhythm and blues discographies